Olaszliszka is a village in Borsod-Abaúj-Zemplén county, Hungary.

Olaszliszka is nestled among the hills of the Tokay countryside (2 hours from Budapest) where the famous Tokay wines come from. It had a population in the 1830s of around 2,682 inhabitants.

Jewish history of the town

In the 1830s the Orthodox Jewish community numbered 70 families, 312 members altogether.

Among them were 57 tax paying citizens:

 1 entrepreneur
 17 small businessmen
 2 farmers
 2 civil servants
 2 self-employed
 5 freelance artists
 8 blue collar workers
 20 engaged in various other forms of employment

Two neighboring counties, as well as the town of Olaszliszka, banded together to supply 5,000 forint (Hungarian currency) toward the religious education as well as the support of the elementary school established in 1872. The elementary school had 1 teacher and 36 students. The Talmud Torah had 1 teacher and 25 students. The Jewish population also supplied the Talmud Torah students with housing and food. The Jewish community also made sure that the Library was well stacked and continually supplemented. The Library Project was called "Chevra Kiyan Seforim," or the Library Supply Committee.

Among other existing organizations are as follows: Chevra Kadisha (taking care of the deceased, funeral services and burials); Discretionary Funds — a poor house where one could stay if they had no place to go.

There are no exact dates given as to when the Jews decided to settle in Olaszliszka, however, it is concretely known that the mainstream of Jews came around 1830 with the advent of the young Rabbi, Zvi-Hersh Friedman (1808–1874). There is no question that the driving force behind the Jewish settlers was the rabbi, who with his great knowledge, human understanding, and wisdom, attracted the vintners (wine merchants) from Poland and Russia, who came for the purpose of buying wine, and subsequently settled in Olaszliszka to be near their rebbe. These men could be counted as the oldest or first settlers who subsequently aided the young Rabbi in establishing the various social services provided by the Jewish community of Olaszliszka.

The original founding fathers of the town, were mainly occupied with the selling, trading, and buying of the famous Tokay wine.

The Jewish population grew considerably with the brisk and successful wine trade. Spiritual religious life was at its focal point led by their spiritual leader Rabbi Zvi-Hersh Friedman, who was at an early age known as a great scholar. The pious young scholar spread far and wide the spirit of Chassidus. In a short time the town of Olaszliszka became the focal point of Chassidus and its rabbi named the father of the Chassidic movement of Hungary.

His humility, selflessness, aesthetic cleanliness, chesed (loving acts of kindness, i.e. charity) and wisdom spread far and wide so that people from foreign countries all over the world came to seek his advice and accept him as their rebbe.

During this time the township of Lisker grew in scope and fame. This affluence lasted till the end of Hershel Lisker's lifetime of four decades.

Gallery

See also
Liske (Hasidic dynasty)

External links
 Street map 
 Olaszliszka 

Populated places in Borsod-Abaúj-Zemplén County